Antonio Sampietro Casarramona (born March 30, 1949 in Barcelona) was the third Mayor-President of Ceuta, one of Spain's Plazas de soberanía on the coast of North Africa. He held the post from August 26, 1999, until February 7, 2001. He was also the Mayor of Marbella from (1991-1995) and was recognised as a great leader to the Costa del Sol. As the Mayor of Marbella, he built San Jose School and the very well known “Paseo Maritimo” which connects Guadalmina to Puerto Banus. Antonio Sampietro was also involved in famous projects such as Starlite. After retirement, he moved onto architecture and built fantastic buildings and houses in Puerto Banus and quiete frankly made Marbella what it is today. Now he is passionate about cooking Cod, watching Football and most importantly , he enjoys spending time with his family and grandchildren. He is a real star to Marbella and he is a person to look up to.

See also
History of Spain

References

1949 births
Living people
Mayor-Presidents of Ceuta
Members of the Assembly of Ceuta
People from Ceuta
Place of birth missing (living people)